Mohammadabad (also Romanized as Moḩammadābād) is a village in Pir Bazar Rural District, in the Central District of Rasht County, Gilan Province, Iran. At the 2006 census, its population was 160, in 48 families.

References 

Populated places in Rasht County